Charles Kaye Friedberg (1905–1972) was an American cardiologist, known for his medical textbook Diseases of the Heart, which was a standard reference in cardiology during the 1950s and 1960s.

Friedberg received in 1925 his bachelor's degree from Columbia University and in 1929 his medical degree from the Columbia University College of Physicians and Surgeons (Vagelos College of Physicians and Surgeons).

In the mid-1930s, with Dr. Louis Gross, Friedberg investigated the cardiac pathoanatomy of rheumatic fever. Friedberg was a consulting cardiologist, and from 1956 to 1969 chief cardiologist, at Mount Sinai Hospital, and was a clinical professor of medicine at Mount Sinai Medical School. He was the author, among other books, of Diseases of the Heart, published in Philadelphia by the W. B. Saunders Company in 1949, with a 2nd edition in 1959 and a 3rd edition in 1966. In 1958 he was the founding editor of the journal Progress in Cardiovascular Diseases. He was appointed editor-in-chief of the American Heart Association's journal Circulation, for a six-year term that started in January 1971, as successor to Howard B. Burchell (1908–2009).

In 1933 Dr. Friedberg married Gertrude Tonkonogy, who was the author of the Broadway play Three Cornered Hat. Upon his death in an automobile accident in 1972 he was survived by his widow, a son Richard, a daughter Barbara, and two grandchildren.

According to the cardiologist Eugene Braunwald, Charles K. Friedburg was one of a small group of outstanding pioneers of cardiology as practiced in the era of medicine from the 1940s to the early 1970s; according to Braunwald the other pioneers included Charles Laubry, Samuel A. Levine, Thomas Lewis, James Mackenzie, John Parkinson, Paul Dudley White, and Paul Hamilton Wood.

References

External links

American cardiologists
1905 births
1972 deaths
Columbia University Vagelos College of Physicians and Surgeons alumni
Icahn School of Medicine at Mount Sinai faculty
Members of the National Academy of Medicine
Fellows of the American College of Cardiology